Christian Stenhammar (1783-1866) was a Swedish naturalist interested in lichens and an entomologist who specialised in Diptera.His collection is held by Uppsala University.He was a clergyman.

Works
Försök till Gruppering och Revision af de Svenska Ephydrinae af Chr. Stenhammar. Stockholm , P.A. Nordstedt, 1844. online
 Schedulæ criticæ de lichenibus exsiccatis Sueciæ (1845) (schedae are belonging to the exsiccata series Lichenes Sueciæ exsiccati)
 Lichenes Sueciæ exsiccati editio altera (åtta delar, 1856-66) (exsiccata).
 Skandinaviens copromyzinæ (1853)

Honours
They have been several genera named to honour Christian Stenhammar including;
 Steenhammera  (Boraginaceae), a synonym of Mertensia,
 Stenhammara  (Lichenes), a synonym of Ropalospora lugubris,
 Stenhammara  (Fungi) ,a synonym of Stenhammarella
 Stenhammarella  (Lichen in Lecideaceae family). 

Steenhamera , Stenhammaria  and Stenhammaria  (all from the Boraginaceae family) are all listed as 'doubtful' genera as they don't have any species listed.

References

Other sources
Eckhard K. Groll 

Swedish entomologists
1866 deaths
1783 births
Dipterists
Swedish lichenologists